Emericiceras is an ammonite genus from the Early Cretaceous belonging to the Ancyloceratoidea. Emericiceras are considered by some authors a junior synonyms of Crioceratites.

Distribution
Fossils of species within this genus have been found in the Cretaceous sediments of 
Antarctica, France, Hungary, Italy, Morocco, Slovakia, South Africa and Spain.

References

 Treatise on Invertebrate Paleontology, Part L, Ammonoidea,--Ancyloceratiaceae; Geological Society of America 1957, reprinted 1990.

Cretaceous ammonites
Ammonites of Europe